Bartolomeo Visconti or Bartolomeo Aicardi Visconti (died 1457) was a Roman Catholic prelate who served as Bishop of Novara (1429–1457).

Biography
Bartolomeo Visconti was born in 1402. 
On 4 November 1429, he was appointed during the papacy of Pope Martin V as Bishop of Novara.
He served as Bishop of Novara until his death on 28 April 1457.

While bishop, he was the principal co-consecrator of Carlo Gabriele Sforza, Archbishop of Milan (1454).

References

External links and additional sources
 (for Chronology of Bishops) 
 (for Chronology of Bishops) 

15th-century Italian Roman Catholic bishops
Bishops appointed by Pope Martin V
1457 deaths
1402 births